Breweries in Georgia produce a wide range of beers in different styles that are marketed locally, regionally and nationally.

In 2012 Georgia's 29 breweries and brewpubs employed 1,650 people directly, and more than 31,000 others in related jobs such as wholesaling and retailing. Including people directly employed in brewing, as well as those who supply Georgia's breweries with everything from ingredients to machinery, the total business and personal tax revenue generated by Georgia's breweries and related industries was more than $1.4 billion. Consumer purchases of Georgia's brewery products generated another $366 million in tax revenue. In 2012, according to the Brewers Association, Georgia ranked 48th in the number of craft breweries per capita, with 24.

For context, at the end of 2013 there were 2,822 breweries in the United States, including 2,768 craft breweries subdivided into 1,237 brewpubs, 1,412 microbreweries and 119 regional craft breweries.  In that same year, according to the Beer Institute, the brewing industry employed around 43,000 Americans in brewing and distribution and had a combined economic impact of more than $246 billion.

Georgia breweries

Historic
1738 - first brewery in Georgia; Major William Horton, aide to James Oglethorpe, administers Jekyll Island; his residence, Horton House, includes a brewery supplying beer to soldiers and settlers in the area

Current

See also 
 Beer in the United States
 List of breweries in the United States
 List of microbreweries

References

Georgia
Lists of companies based in Georgia (U.S. state)
Breweries